Thomas Frederick Revill (9 May 1892 – 29 March 1979) was an English cricketer and footballer.

Football career
He began with youth sides in his native Bolsover before joining Chesterfield in 1911. He scored 19 goals in 17 Midland League games for Chesterfield, and was transferred to  Stoke for £200 in February 1912. He returned to Bolsover in 1914 to play for the local colliery team and turned out with  Chesterfield as a war guest during the 1915–16 and 1916–17 seasons. He made 74 appearances for Stoke scoring 24 goals.

Cricket career

Revill was born at Bolsover, Derbyshire. He made his debut for Derbyshire against Somerset in July 1913 and played one more match that season. After World War I he returned to Derbyshire for eight matches in 1919 and made his top score of 65 not out against Northamptonshire. He played just one game in 1920.

Revill was a left-hand batsman  and played 20 innings in 11 first-class matches with an average of 14.43 and a top score of 65 not out. He was a leg-break and googly bowler, but did not perform in the first-class game.

Revill died at Mansfield, Nottinghamshire at the age of 86. His son Alan Revill also played cricket for Derbyshire.

Career Statistics

References

English footballers
Stoke City F.C. players
Chesterfield F.C. players
1892 births
1979 deaths
English cricketers
Derbyshire cricketers
People from Bolsover
Footballers from Derbyshire
Cricketers from Derbyshire
Association football forwards